The 2018 European Juniors Wrestling Championships was held in Rome, Italy between July 30 - August 5, 2018.

Medal table

Team ranking

Medal summary

Men's freestyle

Men's Greco-Roman

Women's freestyle

References 

Wrestling
European Wrestling Juniors Championships
Sports competitions in Rome
European Juniors Wrestling Championships